New Kabul Bank is a bank in Afghanistan that has its main branch in the capital city of Kabul. It was established in 2004 as the Kabul Bank, the first private bank in Afghanistan. After corruption and scandals it was re-established in 2011 as the New Kabul Bank.

It is the main bank used to pay the salaries of the national army and security police forces. The bank provides facilities to maintain accounts in Current, Savings Bank, and Fixed deposits; and offers its consumers branch and automated teller machine services. The bank is under the supervision of the Central Bank of Afghanistan (Da Afghanistan Bank−DAB), the General Directorate of Treasury, and the Afghanistan Ministry of Finance (MOF).

History

Founding in 2004

The Kabul Bank was established in 2004.

Kabul Bank claims that accounts can be opened and maintained in afghani, U.S. dollars and euro. Kabul Bank claims that it is connected throughout the globe with SWIFT facility, which enables fund transfer for its customers. The bank has correspondent relationship with seven international banks situated in Germany, China, Iran, Tajikistan, Saudi Arabia and India.

Corruption scandal
Kabul Bank was badly shaken and almost collapsed in 2011, in one of "the worst banking scandals in history", according to The Guardian newspaper. In late 2012, according to the Los Angeles Times, independent investigators and journalists uncovered widespread corruption in Kabul Bank. The New York Times, in 2012, headlines indicate "Audit Says Kabul Bank Began as 'Ponzi Scheme'" following investigation and judicial action in the aftermath of the Bank's crisis and scandal.

In 2010, it was disclosed that its Chairman Sherkhan Farnood and other insiders were spending the bank's US$1 billion for their own personal lavish style living and lending money under the table to family, relatives and friends. The bank scandal also involved members of Afghan President Karzai's family, including his brother Mahmood Karzai. In September 2010, one of the principal owners of the bank said that depositors had withdrawn $180 million in two days and predicted a "revolution" in the country's financial system unless the Afghan government and the United States moved quickly to help stabilize the bank. In November 2010, reports appeared that Farnood and chief executive Khalilullah Frozi both had been sacked from duties; as of early 2011 both were effectively under house arrest and could not leave the country, and in July 2011 both were formally arrested and detained in Kabul. DAB stated in February 2011, it would seek to sell Kabul Bank within three years once it was rehabilitated, but both the International Monetary Fund and US officials subsequently pressed for a rapid wind down of the institution. A USAID inspector general report estimated that fraudulent loans diverted $850 million to bank insiders. By October 2011, more than a year after the government seized control, officials had recovered less than 10 percent of the nearly $1 billion that went missing.

Bank run and panic in 2010
After only six years in operation, in 2010 there was a panic of customers seeking to withdraw their savings from the bank.  Despite nearly $1 billion in U.S. taxpayers' funded assistance in the form of Afghan government salaries deposited into Kabul Bank, Kabul Bank was on the brink of collapse and mobs of customers massed outside of bank locations trying to get their deposits out of the bank with limited luck.

Despite Kabul Bank's near collapse in 2010 during the corruption allegations, Kabul Bank claims it is significant to Afghanistan's internal security and stability because it is the vehicle used to pay, largely with money supplied by the United States government, as many as 300,000 Afghan government employees, mostly military and police, who are key to plans to rebuild Afghanistan's capacity to deal with its ongoing Taliban-led insurgency. President Karzai's brother, Mahmood Karzai, is reported to have played a significant role in the bank scandal, and is alleged to have received millions of dollars in loans from Kabul Bank. He was later alleged to be under investigation by a U.S. Federal grand jury and U.S. tax authorities, including the U.S. Internal Revenue Service for tax evasion allegations.  Canada's Maclean's magazine reported that Mahmoud Karzai was being investigated for racketeering, extortion and tax evasion as a result of connections to the bank and Hamid Karzai.

During the bank scandal and panic in September 2010, hundreds of Afghans, including many civil servants and their families, gathered outside Kabul Bank offices in the capital and elsewhere in Afghanistan. Long lines formed of depositors hoping to withdrawal some or all of their money. Afghan police beat back mobs at the Kabul Bank worried their money would be lost according to The Washington Post. Panic set in among many depositors according to reports by The New York Times.

On 27 December 2010, a suicide car bomber killed at least three Afghans, including one policeman, as he targeted police officers who lined up to withdraw their salaries in front of Kabul Bank in central Kandahar; the midday explosion also wounded 16 policemen and five civilians, officials said.

2011 aftermath of panic
On 19 February 2011, at least 38 people (including 13 policemen) were killed during an insurgent raid on a branch of Kabul Bank in Jalalabad, the provincial capital of Nangarhar, and at least three militants were killed, officials said.  Three suicide bombers reportedly entered the bank and detonated themselves, and fighting between insurgents and security forces continued for over four hours; President Hamid Karzai and a NATO International Security Assistance Force spokesman condemned the attack, which was the deadliest in the country since June 2010.

In its July 2011 review of the Kabul Bank scandal and its aftermath, international non-governmental organization (NGO) Transparency International raised repeated concerns about problems of corruption in Afghanistan and its impact on the economy, business investment, security and civil society.

2010 depositor panic and aftermath
In early 2010, the Washington Post reported that the Kabul Bank played a part in "a crony capitalism that enriches politically connected insiders and dismays the Afghan populace."

At the beginning of September, Frozi, one of the two largest shareholders of Kabul Bank, said reports indicating that the institution had lost as much as $300 million were overstated. But he predicted that if Afghan depositors continued to withdraw their money at the current rate, Kabul Bank would almost certainly collapse, undermining confidence in the nascent financial system the Afghans have been trying to build with American help. "If this goes on, we won’t survive", Mr. Frozi said in an interview. "If people lose trust in the banks, there will be a revolution in the financial system."

Afghan leaders promised to guarantee deposits in an attempt to arrest the panic, which began at the end of August 2010 when the country's top banking officials demanded the resignations of both Frozi and Farnood. "The government has decided that there will be an audit firm that will be coming to audit not only Kabul Bank accounts but also other private banks in Afghanistan", an Afghan presidential spokesman announced in late October.  Earlier in the month, the government also froze assets held by some of Kabul Bank's owners even as the central bank governor said it was solvent and had the backing of Karzai's administration. U.S.-educated economist Hamidullah Farooqi, a former Karzai minister and chairman of the Afghanistan International Chamber of Commerce, said Afghanistan received a "massive wake-up call" from the crisis, further stating:  "It's not just a lack of capacity in our institutions, there is a lack of laws and a lack of accountability, which is much more serious.  It's a case of the blind leading the blind.  They are too young, they are babies."

Mahmood Karzai is one of the brothers of Afghan President Hamid Karzai and a seven-percent shareholder in the bank. In a telephone interview with the Boston Globe in September 2010, he said: "America should do something." In October, the Washington Post reported that Mahmood Karzai could soon be indicted for tax evasion in the U.S., though he denied the charges, telling the newspaper: "I'm very clean", and insisting his only interest was "rebuilding Afghanistan."

In mid-January 2011, acting chief financial officer and other Pakistani employees of Kabul Bank fled to Pakistan, apparently out of fear for their lives and possible arrest, though some said they were being made scapegoats for powerful shareholders.  Afghan authorities also called in several bank managers, including foreigners, for questioning and detained some in southern Afghanistan's Helmand Province in connection with illicit transfers of bank funds.

In early February 2011, DAB Governor Abdul Qadir Fitrat said the central bank would impose stricter rules on banks wanting to handle about US$1.5 billion worth of salaries for government and security officials, which until now has been done by Kabul Bank.  Fitrat also told Reuters the total amount of money at risk over suspected irregularities at Kabul Bank amounted to $579 million, almost twice the figure estimated when the bank's troubles first surfaced.  Fitrat dismissed concerns that it faced liquidation, saying it would be privately owned again within three years. "Kabulbank is stabilised, it has enough cash at its disposal and the central bank is trying to rehabilitate the bank and then at some point sell it to potential buyers in two or three years," Fitrat told Reuters. In early July 2011, Fitrat resigned as head of the central bank after fleeing to the United States, claiming his life had been threatened and that he was being made a scapegoat for politically connected individuals.

After a mid-February 2011 visit by Neal Wolin, the U.S. deputy Treasury secretary, the Afghan finance ministry said that weak international support had exacerbated the crisis.  "Afghan and US officials agreed that (the crisis)... was compounded by the erroneous audit by PricewaterhouseCoopers, and ineffective international technical assistance and supervision", the ministry said.  However, Wolin pressed the government to rapidly place the lender into receivership, echoing calls made by a previous International Monetary Fund (IMF) delegation.  "The deputy secretary... stressed the need for the Afghan government to take swift and decisive action to ensure a credible, effective resolution of issues related to Kabul Bank," the U.S. embassy said in statement. Kabul Bank was put into receivership following the scandal and a new bank set up, but only $70 million of fraudulent loans it granted have so far been recovered, with criminal investigations ongoing.  In October 2011, Afghanistan's parliament approved a $51 million payment to DAB as part of a planned compensation package over its multi-million-dollar bailout; the payment is part of a package of government measures agreed with the IMF to secure a new loan. Afghanistan has been without an IMF program since the Kabul Bank failure, but the IMF announced that it is moving ahead on a new $129 million loan in the wake of the government's reform promises, with a new program expected to be submitted to the IMF executive board for approval in November 2011.

At the end of June 2011, the Washington Post reported that Farnood and Frozi used fake names, forged documents, fictitious companies and secret records as part of an elaborate ruse to funnel hundreds of millions of dollars to shareholders and top Afghan officials, including President Karzai's brother Mahmood and Mohammed Fahim, the country's first vice president.  Both Farnood and Frozi were arrested in Kabul and held without charge, even though Afghanistan's attorney general said the evidence against them was "quite clear".  Without a successful resolution of Kabul Bank's problems, one senior U.S. official said Afghanistan could face "the collapse of the banking sector." As of October 2011, neither man had yet been charged with a crime, but Deputy Attorney General Enayatullah Nazari said the government intends to bring them to court.

"A crime has happened", Nazari said. "They will go to the court whether they manage to secure the money or not".  Authorities loosened the terms of their detention and provided them with a security detail to go to a bank office on workdays and on occasion to fancy restaurants and hotels for what Nazari described as work meetings.

Depositor losses from collapse
With regard to public sector corruption in Afghanistan and the loss of nearly U.S. $1 billion in U.S. taxpayers' funded foreign assistance to Afghanistan in the form of U.S.-supplied Afghan government and Afghan military and police salaries deposited into Kabul Bank, The New Yorker Magazine, The Wall Street Journal, The New York Times, National Public Radio (NPR) and others, have reported that widespread corruption, ponzi schemes, fraudulent loans, mass looting, insider loans to fake and bogus companies run by family and friends, and other corrupted practices, were undertaken by a small group of Afghan insiders (less than 12 people), apparently linked to Mahmoud Karzai, President Hamid Karzai and Ahmed Wali Karzai. This resulted in nearly $1 billion ($900 million) in Kabul Bank's deposits seemingly vanishing into Dubai and other off-shore locations and unknown offshore bank accounts and tax havens.  Hundreds of millions of U.S. dollars were often smuggled and flown out of Afghanistan secretly stashed in bags and airline food trays

2012 anti-corruption report and reform efforts
On 28 November 2012, the Independent Joint Anti-Corruption Monitoring and Evaluation Committee published its report and declared in a news conference that US$5 billion, including $400 million the Kabul Bank's shareholders, were illegally transferred abroad. About 22 people are accused of embezzlement in the case, and their trial started. At three hearings, 18 people, including Sher Khan Farnood and Khalil Ferozi, appeared before the court to defend themselves. Some $935 million of the bank assets was transferred abroad through various systems and $825 million are needed to bail out the bank. The Afghan government will have to pay 5–6% of its GDP to save the bank, which would be a huge blow to the country's economy.

Since 2011, the Karzai Government has rejected banking oversight and reform efforts by the United States in the wake of the Kabul Bank scandal and collapse according to reports by the U.S. Special Inspector General for Afghanistan Reconstruction (SIGAR) in 2013–14.

Banking experts, economists and humanitarian aid officials have expressed serious concern about this development given Kabul Bank's large and historic dependence on U.S. taxpayers' funding of bank deposits via payments of the Afghan National Army soldiers, police and Afghanistan's civil service employees who are largely paid with billions of dollars in U.S. aid to the Karzai government and to Afghanistan from the U.S. Congress, U.S. Treasury and ultimately U.S. taxpayer.

The U.S. government has found anti-corruption efforts in Afghanistan in the wake of the Kabul Bank crisis as deeply troubling, including the banking sector, according to reports by the Washington Post in 2012 and SIGAR.

2014 murder of IMF official and executive sentences

In January 2014, the International Monetary Fund's (IMF) representative Wabel Abdallah, who assisted in the Kabul Bank crisis aftermath, was murdered by suicide bombers and gunmen in Kabul along with some 21 others in a high-profile attack that the Taliban said they undertook. Abdallah headed the IMF's office in Afghanistan since 2008.

Following the departure of Afghanistan's President Hamid Karzai in 2014, President Ashraf Ghani re-opened efforts to bring former Kabul Bank officials involved in the Kabul Bank Crisis to justice, extend and enforce prison sentences for those previously convicted, and seek to recover hundreds of millions of U.S. and Afghan taxpayers' dollars in funds stolen or lost by embezzlement, corruption, and fraud by the bank's insiders. Ghani vowed to seek to continue the investigation of the Kabul Bank crisis and fight corruption in Afghanistan.  In October 2014, the Ghani Administration in Kabul reportedly officially re-opened the investigation.

New company

After corruption and scandals it was re-established in 2011 as the New Kabul Bank.

In 2011, 38 customers at the bank's branch in Jalalabad were killed by a Taliban bombing. Fighting with security forces lasted four hours, and four of the attackers were killed. Two men were later charged for the attack and executed in June 2011. A third person was sentenced to prison.

In September 2010, the Afghan Central Bank said it was prepared to provide loans to the Kabul Bank, "if it requests". After the bailout by the government, by 2015, authorities were inviting bids to privatize the new bank. In 2016, Afghanistan's Joint-Stock Company offered to buy New Kabul Bank for $31 million. Pakistan's MCB Bank also made a bid, as New Kabul Bank was to be privatized in October 2018.

In April 2015, the Islamic State or an associated group claimed responsibility for a suicide bombing at the entrance of a New Kabul Bank branch in Jalalabad, where government workers waited in line to collect salaries. 34 people were killed at least, and 125 injured. In June 2017, a Taliban suicide bomber killed 29 people at a Kabul Bank branch in the Helmand province.

In August 2017, there were reports of long lines and slow services at the New Kabul Bank branch in the Paktika province, where it was the only bank in the region. That month, a suicide bomber targeted the Kabul Bank branch entrance close to the US embassy, resulting in five reported deaths. The Taliban claimed responsibility.

2021 Bank Run

The New Kabul Bank suffered a bank run in the leadup to the 2021 Fall of Afghanistan, as panicked citizens sought to withdraw their life savings ahead of anticipated disruption under Taliban rule.

See also

 Corruption in Afghanistan
 Da Afghanistan Bank
 
 Special Inspector General for Afghanistan Reconstruction
 Transparency International

References

External links
 Official New Kabul Bank website

Banks of Afghanistan
Banks established in 2004
Banks established in 2011
Banking controversies
Bank failures
Controversies in Afghanistan
Corporate scandals
Corruption in Afghanistan
Economy of Afghanistan
Islamic banks
Hamid Karzai
Karzai family
Organisations based in Kabul
2004 establishments in Afghanistan
2010s in Afghanistan
2011 establishments in Afghanistan
2011 scandals